Chithrakuzhal is a 2010 Malayalam film directed by Majeed Gulistan. Chithrakuzhal (Binoculars) is a Children's film based on environmental issues and protection of the Nature. The title of the English version of the film is The Bird Catcher.

Synopsis
A Forest Ranger’s school going kid Charu happens to get lost in the forest by a trap laid by the poachers who had a grudge with his father. Caught and taken away by the poachers, the boy is spotted by a tribal boy Virundhan who lives in the forest and who is incidentally his classmate too. In the school the tribal boy got a nickname ‘The Bird Catcher’ as he is believed to catch & take away the birds for cooking and eating.
The tribal boy, who was in the forest searching for some very rare herbal medicinal plants for his ailing mother, becomes the savior & guide to the forest officer’s son. The journey also reveals the many conditions, skills & qualities of the tribal boy Virundhan to Charu, who is of the modern upbringing.
Both of them chance to meet Amina, a girl of their class, who also happened to be in the forest, running away for fear of police. In the daring journey of the three together, they deal the dangers and obstacles and also learn about the environment & the threats lurking in it.
The journey and its experience eventually transforms them to sharing and concerned human beings with better values.

Cast
 Amal Ashok as Virundhan, the tribal boy
 Sidharth as Charu, the forest Ranger's son
 Meera Nair as Amina, the classmate
 Madhu as Charu's grandfather
 Vijayaraghavan as the Forst Ranger (Charu's father)
 Geetha Vijayan as Charu's mother
 Stella as Amina's mother
 Vijayakumari as Virundhan's mother
 Sunitha as the tribal woman
 Indrans as the Forest guard
 Monu as the Big Fat

Filming
The film was  set in the backdrop of the forests of the Western Ghats in South Kerala.
It was shot in the deep forests of Peppara, Neyyar, Agasthyarkoodam and Meenmutty.
The film was completed in 2009 and competed for the best Children's film in the Kerala state film awards and the National film awards.
Chithrakuzhal has the distinction of being the first Dolby Digital Children's film in Malayalam.
The film was premièred in Thiruvananthapuram on 6 October 2010 during an exhibition on wildlife, in the presence of the Minister of Forests Mr. Benoy Viswam

Accolades
Chithrakuzhal was selected to the 2011 Lucknow International Children's Film festival.
The film was selected to the 34th Cairo International Film Festival.

Soundtrack
The music of Chithrakuzhal was done by Ashwin Johnson. The lyrics are by renowned Malayalam poet Kavalam Narayana Panicker. The song "Thathindhaka theytharo" sung by Sri Devi, Jenny, Lekshmi and Kanchana is very popular among children.

References

External links
 Official site
 Nowrunning.com article

2010 films
2010s Malayalam-language films
2010s adventure films
2010s buddy films
Environmental films
Indian buddy films
Indian children's films
Films shot in Thiruvananthapuram
Films shot in Kerala
Films set in Kerala
2010 directorial debut films
2010 drama films